Feltre is a town and comune of the province of Belluno in Veneto, northern Italy. The Dolomites loom to the north of the town.

In 2014, the Feltrino area was formalised in the Unione Montana Feltrina (Feltrino Mountain Community).

History 

It was known in Roman times as Feltria and described as an oppidum by Pliny, who assigned its foundation to the Alpine tribe of the Rhaetians. The city obtained the status of municipium in 49 BC with its citizens inscribed into the Roman tribe of Menenia.  In spite of its rigorous climate, which led a Roman author, perhaps Caesar, to write:
Feltria perpetuo niveum damnata rigore
Atque mihi posthac haud adeunda, vale
Feltria lay on a Roman road mentioned in the Antonine Itinerary as passing from Opitergium (Oderzo) through Feltria to Tridentum (Trento).

After the fall of the Western Empire, under which it had developed into a flourishing city, it became a Lombard dominion. Later in the Middle Ages, it was ruled by Ezzelino III da Romano, by the Camino family, and then by the Scaligeri of Verona, from 1315 to 1337. Feltre was subsequently under Charles IV, Holy Roman Emperor, the da Carrara and the Visconti until 1404, when, together with Belluno, it was conquered by the Republic of Venice. In 1499 it received a new line of walls.

In 1509 the center of the town was mostly destroyed during battles between the Venetians and the League of Cambrai, and later rebuilt with a characteristic 16th-century style. In 1797, after the capitulation of Venice to Napoleon, it was ruled for some time by the French. Napoleon made his minister of war, Henri Jacques Guillaume Clarke, Duke of Feltre in 1807. After the Congress of Vienna (1814), Feltre was assigned to the Austrian Empire, to which it remained until it was joined to the Kingdom of Italy in 1866.

It was besieged by Austria during World War I.

During World War II, Adolf Hitler demanded a meeting with Benito Mussolini to discuss his strategy for defending Italy from the Allied Armies since the Axis armies had just surrendered Tunis to the British Army, giving Allied Armies total control of North Africa. This meeting took place on July 19, 1943 in Feltre, Italy.

Notable people of Feltre include printer Panfilo Castaldi, Friar Minor, missionary and founder of Monti di Pietà Blessed Bernardine of Feltre,  humanist educator Vittorino da Feltre and painter Morto da Feltre.

Main sights 
The Cathedral, dedicated to St. Peter and rebuilt in Renaissance times. It has maintained from the preceding buildings the apse and the 14th-century campanile. The interior has works by Pietro Marescalchi and some 17th-century wooden statues. The church is flanked by the 15th-century baptistry, housing a precious Medieval baptismal font from 1399. Under the cathedral is an excavated archaeological area of  belonging to the ancient Roman city.
The Imperial Gate (1489, restored in 1545), from which the Via Mezzaterra starts. This is faced by the noteworthy Casa Crico, Casa Cantoni and Palazzo Muffoni.
Palazzo Salce.
The Palazzo della Ragione (16th century), the current Town Hall, with a Palladian style portico. It opens to the Piazza Maggiore, one of the most beautiful in the Veneto, with a fountain by Tullio Lombardo and a column surmounted by the Lion of St. Mark. In the same piazza are Palazzo Guarnieri and a Baroque staircase leading to the church of St. Roch (1576–1632), flanked by the so-called "Castle of Alboin" with the Torre dell'Orologio, once part of the Roman defensive apparatus. The Castle's attribution to the Lombard king of Alboin has no historical evidence.
The Pinacoteca, in Palazzo Villabruna, has works by Morto da Feltre, Cima da Conegliano, Gentile Bellini, Pietro Marescalchi and others.
The church and the monastery of Santa Maria degli Angeli, begun in 1492, but entirely renovated in the 19th century, has maintained part of the ancient cloister. It houses a painting by Jacopo Bassano.

Outside the city are:
The sanctuary of SS. Vittore e Corona (12th-15th century), dedicated to Saints Victor and Corona, outside the city shows a mix of Byzantine and Renaissance styles, and is home to some 14th-century Giottesque frescoes. Sculptures include the martyrium that houses the relics of the two Eastern saints and a small statue of St. Victor.
The late Renaissance Villa Pasole - Berton stands on the site of the Castle of Pedavena, destroyed by Emperor Charles IV in 1350.

Frazioni 
Anzù, Arson, Canal, Cart, Cellarda, Croci, Farra, Foen, Grum, Lamen, Lasen, Mugnai, Nemeggio, Pont, Pren, Sanzan, Tomo, Umin, Vellai, Vignui, Villabruna, Villaga, Villapaiera, Zermen.

Twin towns – sister cities

Feltre is twinned with:

 Bagnols-sur-Cèze, France
 Braunfels, Germany
 Carcaixent, Spain
 Dudelange, Luxembourg
 Eeklo, Belgium
 Kiskunfélegyháza, Hungary
 Newbury, England, United Kingdom

Gallery

References

External links 
 Official website of the Palio of Feltre

Cities and towns in Veneto
Territories of the Republic of Venice